This is a list of the foreign players in the Segunda División. To be in the list players must have played at least one game in the Segunda División.

The players in Bold are those who are currently playing in Segunda División.

Albania 

Iván Balliu – Barcelona B, Almería – 2010–13, 2019–21
Keidi Bare – Málaga, Espanyol – 2018–21
Vullnet Basha – Real Zaragoza, Ponferradina, UCAM Murcia – 2014–17
Ervin Fakaj – Toledo – 1997–98
Kleandro Lleshi – Cartagena – 2020–21
Elvir Maloku – Gimnàstic – 2016–17
Rey Manaj – Granada, Albacete – 2017–20
Armando Sadiku – Málaga, Las Palmas, Cartagena – 2019–20, 2021–
Myrto Uzuni – Granada – 2022–

Algeria 
Rachid Aït-Atmane – Gijón, Tenerife – 2014–15, 2016–18
Mohamed Benkhemassa – Málaga – 2019–21
Hameur Bouazza – Racing Santander – 2012–13
Liassine Cadamuro – Mallorca, Osasuna, Gimnàstic – 2013–15, 2018–19
Karim Chaban – Albacete – 2022–
Walid Cherfa – Gimnàstic, Albacete – 2008–11
Kamel Ghilas – Celta Vigo – 2008–09
Foued Kadir – Betis, Getafe, Alcorcón – 2014–15, 2016–18
Mehdi Lacen – Deportivo Alavés, Getafe, Málaga – 2006–08, 2016–17, 2018–19 
Ali Radjel – Numancia – 2019–20
Abderrahman Rebbach – Deportivo Alavés – 2022–
Yanis Rahmani – Almería, Lugo, Málaga, Eibar – 2019–

Andorra 
Iker Álvarez – Villarreal CF B – 2022–
Marc Bernaus – Barcelona B, Toledo, Gimnàstic, Las Palmas, Getafe, Elche, Polideportivo Ejido, Girona – 1996–97, 1998–2000, 2001–10
Ildefons Lima – Las Palmas, Polideportivo Ejido, Rayo Vallecano – 2002–05
Justo Ruiz – Bilbao Athletic, Eibar – 1987–88, 1989–93

Angola 
Jérémie Bela – Albacete – 2017–19
Anderson Cruz – Fuenlabrada – 2019–20
Manucho – Real Valladolid, Rayo Vallecano – 2010–11, 2016–18
Jorge Mendonça – Deportivo La Coruña – 1958–59
Jonás Ramalho – Bilbao Athletic, Girona – 2013–17, 2019–21
Rudy – Deportivo La Coruña – 2013–14

Argentina 
José Acciari – Murcia, Córdoba, Elche, Girona – 2001–02, 2005–06, 2007–14
Nicolás Aguirre – Granada – 2018–19
Cristian Darío Álvarez – Real Zaragoza – 2017–
Matías Alustiza – Albacete – 2007–08
Cristian Osvaldo Álvarez – Córdoba, Tenerife – 2004–06, 2007–09
Gabriel Amato – Betis, Levante – 2000–01, 2002–03
Horacio Ameli – Rayo Vallecano – 1997–98
Franco Amoroso – Xerez – 2012–13
Daniel Aquino – Real Murcia, Mérida, Real Betis – 1989–91, 1992–94, 1996–97
Sergio Araujo – Barcelona B, Las Palmas – 2012–13, 2014–15, 2018–20
Mariano Armentano – Elche – 1999–2000, 2002–03
Emiliano Armenteros – Sevilla Atlético, Rayo Vallecano – 2007–09, 2010–11, 2017–18
Joaquín Arzura – Osasuna, Almería – 2017–19
Martín Astudillo – Deportivo Alavés – 2003–05, 2006–09
Lucas Aveldaño – Mallorca, Tenerife – 2015–18
Ezequiel Ávila – Huesca – 2017–18
Federico Azcárate – Real Murcia – 2004–05
Juan Manuel Azconzábal – Las Palmas – 2007–08
Luciano Balbi – Real Valladolid, Extremadura – 2016–17, 2018–19
Matías Ballini – Girona – 2011–12
Mariano Barbosa – Las Palmas – 2010–14
Jerónimo Barrales – Recreativo – 2009–10
Fernando Barrientos – Villarreal B – 2011–12
Federico Basavilbaso – Tenerife – 1999–2001, 2002–04
José Belforti – Lugo – 2012–13
Eduardo Berizzo – Celta Vigo – 2004–05
Hernán Bernardello – Almería, Deportivo Alavés – 2011–12, 2015–16
Federico Bessone – Gimnàstic – 2007–08
Leonardo Biagini – Rayo Vallecano, Gijón, Albacete – 2003–07
Matías Biscay – Compostela – 1999–2001
David Bisconti – Badajoz – 1998–99
Mariano Bíttolo – Córdoba, Cartagena – 2016–18
Aitor Blanco – Mirandés – 2012–13
Gustavo Blanco Leschuk – Málaga, Real Oviedo, Eibar – 2018–19, 2020–
Albano Bizzarri – Real Valladolid – 2004–06
Roberto Bonano – Deportivo Alavés – 2004–05, 2006–08
Fabián Bonhoff – Castellón, Palamós – 1988–89, 1990–93
Leonardo Borzani – Las Palmas – 2010–11
Emiliano Buendía – Getafe, Cultural Leonesa – 2016–18
Julio Buffarini – Huesca, FC Cartagena – 2021–22
Esteban Burgos – Alcorcón, Eibar – 2017–19, 2021–
Germán Burgos – Atlético Madrid – 2001–02
Nahuel Bustos – Girona – 2020–
Pablo Nicolás Caballero – Lugo, Almería – 2014–19
Willy Caballero – Elche – 2005–11
Mario Cabrera – Castellón – 1978–80, 1988–89
Fernando Cáceres – Córdoba – 2004–05
Juan Pablo Caffa – Real Zaragoza, Betis – 2008–11
Jeremías Caggiano – Albacete – 2007–08
Pablo Calandria – Leganés, Gijón, Hércules, Albacete – 2002–08
Esteban Cambiasso – Real Madrid Castilla – 1996–98
Héctor Canteros – Villarreal – 2012–13
Tomás Cardona – Las Palmas – 2020–21
Jorge Carrascal – Sevilla Atlético – 2016–17
Sebastián Carrera – Real Murcia – 2004–06
Federico Cartabia – Deportivo La Coruña – 2017–18
Gastón Casas – Recreativo, Elche, Cádiz, Córdoba – 2005–09
Gonzalo Castellani – Villarreal B – 2010–12
Ezequiel Castillo – Espanyol, Rayo Vallecano, Badajoz – 1989–90, 1997–2000
Gastón del Castillo – Cádiz – 2016–17
Raúl Castronovo – CD Málaga – 1975–76
Pablo Cavallero – Levante – 2005–06
Fernando Cavenaghi – Villarreal – 2012–13
Gastón Cellerino – Celta Vigo – 2009–10
Francisco Cerro – Rayo Vallecano – 2017–18
Nereo Champagne – Real Oviedo – 2018–20
Pablo Chavarría – Málaga – 2020–
Leandro Chichizola – Cartagena – 2020–21
Juan Manuel Cobo – Elche – 2007–09
Diego Colotto – Deportivo La Coruña – 2011–12
Fernando Coniglio – Tenerife – 2018–19
Facundo Coria – Villarreal B – 2010–11
Tino Costa – Almería – 2017–18
Franco Cristaldo – Elche, Rayo Vallecano – 2015–17
Braian Cufré – Mallorca, Málaga – 2020–
Jorge D'Alessandro – Salamanca – 1981–82
Siro Darino – Getafe, Las Palmas – 2000–01, 2006–10
Pablo De Blasis – Cartagena – 2020–
Pablo De Muner – Polideportivo Ejido – 2007–08
Hermes Desio – Salamanca, Deportivo Alavés – 1996–98
Christian Díaz – Levante, Ciudad Murcia, Almería – 2002–05
Cristian Díaz – Atlético B, Málaga, Elche, Salamanca, Gijón, Ciudad Murcia, Granada 74 – 1997–2008
Daniel "Cata" Díaz – Getafe – 2016–17
Alejandro Domínguez – Rayo Vallecano – 2017–18
Federico Domínguez – Leganés – 2003–04
Sebastián Dubarbier – Tenerife, Córdoba, Almería – 2010–13, 2015–17
Sergio Egea – Elche – 1980–81
Gonzalo Escobar – Ibiza – 2021–
Juan Esnáider – Real Madrid Castilla – 1991–93
Fabián Espíndola – Albacete – 2017–18
Cristian Espinoza – Real Valladolid – 2016–17
Alejandro Faurlín – Getafe, Mallorca – 2016–17, 2018–19
Federico Fazio – Sevilla Atlético – 2006–08
Augusto Fernández – Cádiz – 2019–20
Turu Flores – Las Palmas, Ciudad Murcia – 1996–98, 2003–04
Juan Forlín – Real Oviedo – 2017–19
Leo Franco – Huesca – 2015–16
Franchu – Fuenlabrada, Eibar – 2020–
Martín Fúriga – Levante – 2001–02
Francisco Fydriszewski – Lugo – 2017–18
Adolfo Gaich – Huesca – 2021–22
Luciano Galletti – Real Zaragoza – 2002–03
Cristian García – Real Murcia, Tenerife – 2011–13, 2014–15
Mateo García – Osasuna, Alcorcón – 2017–18
Amadeo Gasparini – Málaga – 1980–82
Gianfranco Gazzaniga – Ponferradina – 2019–21
Paulo Gazzaniga – Rayo Vallecano – 2016–17
Santiago Gentiletti – Albacete – 2018–19
Tiago Geralnik – Villarreal CF B – 2022–
Darío Alberto Gigena – Rayo Vallecano – 1997–98
Leandro Gioda – Xerez – 2010–11
Ignacio Carlos González – Las Palmas – 1998–99, 2006–08
Silvio González – Córdoba – 2003–05
Nicolás Gorosito – Getafe, Albacete, Alcorcón – 2016–
Patricio Graff – Gijón, Rayo Vallecano, Numancia, Hércules – 2000–01, 2003–04, 2005–08
Fausto Grillo –  Ibiza – 2022–
Carmelo Giuliano – Hércules – 1982–83
Gonzalo – Málaga – 2019–20
Pablo Guede – Málaga, Elche, Polideportivo Ejido – 1998–2002
Diego Herner – Las Palmas – 2011–12
Guillermo Hoyos – Real Madrid Castilla – 1981–82
José Raúl Iglesias – Recreativo – 1977–78
Carlos Izquierdoz – Gijón – 2022–
Diego Klimowicz – Rayo Vallecano – 1997–98
Mariano Konyk – Sevilla Atlético – 2017–18
César La Paglia – Tenerife – 2003–06
Matías Lequi – Celta Vigo – 2007–08
Raúl Longhi – San Andrés – 1973–76
Gustavo López – Celta Vigo, Cádiz – 2004–05, 2007–08
Víctor López – Real Sociedad – 2007–08
Carlos Luna – Elche – 2007–08
Ezequiel Luna – Tenerife – 2008–09, 2010–11
Carlos Luque – Alcorcón – 2016–17
Federico Lussenhoff – Tenerife – 1999–2001
Germán Lux – Deportivo La Coruña  – 2011–12, 2013–14
Sergio Maciel – Toledo – 1997–98
Edgardo Madinabeytia – Real Murcia – 1968–69
Martín Mantovani – Leganés, Las Palmas – 2014–16, 2018–20
Nicolás Martínez – Real Murcia – 2012–13
Tomás Martínez – Tenerife – 2015–16
Diego Mateo – Racing Santander, Real Valladolid – 2001–02, 2004–05
Marcos Mauro – Cádiz – 2017–20
Javier Mazzoni – Racing Santander, Polideportivo Ejido – 2001–03
Óscar Mena – Atlético Madrid, Racing Santander, Las Palmas – 2000–02, 2003–04
Sebastián Méndez – Celta Vigo – 2004–05
Felipe Mesones – Real Murcia, Levante – 1958–63
Ramón Miérez – Tenerife – 2019–20
Ariel Montenegro – Córdoba, Numancia, Hércules – 2000–08
Hugo Morales – Tenerife – 1999–2001, 2002–03
Mateo Musacchio – Villarreal B, Villarreal – 2009–10, 2012–13
Damián Musto – Cartagena – 2022–
Roberto Nanni – Almería – 2004–05
Cristian Nasuti – Lorca – 2017–18
Mauro Navas – Leganés – 2003–04
Fabián Noguera – Gimnàstic, Ponferradina – 2018–20
Juan Carlos Olave – Real Murcia – 2004–06
Esteban Orfano – Villarreal B – 2011–12
Thiago Ojeda – Villarreal B – 2022–
Luis Oruezábal – Granada, Real Jaén – 1976–79
Germán Pacheco – Rayo Vallecano, Córdoba – 2009–10, 2013–14
Gino Padula – Elche – 1998–99
Mario Paglialunga – Hércules, Real Zaragoza, Ponferradina – 2012–15
Nacho Pais – Cartagena – 2022–
Mariano Pavone – Betis – 2009–10
Matías Pavoni – Cádiz – 2003–05, 2006–07
Pablo Paz – Tenerife – 1999–2001
Hernán Pellerano – Almería – 2012–13
Gabriel Peñalba – Las Palmas – 2018–19
Daniel Pendín – Burgos, Xerez, Castellón – 2001–10
Guillermo Pereyra – Real Murcia – 2009–10
Damián Pérez – Gijón – 2019–20
Diego Perotti – Sevilla Atlético – 2007–09
Damián Petcoff – Córdoba, Real Jaén – 2012–14
Leonardo Ponzio – Real Zaragoza – 2008–09
Martín Posse – Tenerife – 2003–04
Abel Morán Puente – Real Valladolid,  Atlético Baleares, Granada  – 1958–59, 1961–64
Diego Quintana – Real Murcia – 2001–03
Mauro Quiroga – Las Palmas, Lugo, Deportivo Alavés – 2010–14
Juan Ramírez – Almería – 2015–16
Juan Pablo Raponi – Ponferradina, Racing de Ferrol  – 2006–08
Nico Ratti – Llagostera – 2015–16
Gustavo Reggi – Las Palmas, Levante, Castellón – 2002–04, 2005–06, 2007–08
Ezequiel Rescaldani – Huesca – 2017–18
Germán Rivarola – Gijón – 2000–01
Carlos Roa – Albacete – 2002–03
Lucas Robertone – Almería – 2020–
Pablo Rodríguez – Leganés – 2003–04
Esteban Rolón – Málaga – 2019–21
Maxi Rolón – Barcelona B – 2014–15
Luka Romero – Mallorca – 2020–21
Miguel Ángel Sebastián Romero – Eibar – 2003–04
Sebastián Ariel Romero – Betis, Córdoba – 2000–02
Ariel Rosada – Celta Vigo – 2008–09
Marco Ruben – Villarreal B – 2009–10
Franco Russo – Mallorca, Ponferradina – 2018–21
Sebastián Saja – Rayo Vallecano, Córdoba, Gimnàstic, Real Zaragoza – 2003–05, 2016–17
Andrés San Martín – Tenerife – 2006–07
Mauro dos Santos – Real Murcia, Tenerife – 2012–14, 2018–20
Brian Sarmiento – Xerez, Girona, Salamanca – 2008–11
Darío Sarmiento – Girona – 2021–
Gustavo Savoia – Córdoba – 2009–10
Gabriel Schürrer – Málaga – 2006–07
Leonardo Sequeira – Real Oviedo – 2022–
Jonathan Silva – Leganés – 2020–22
Giuliano Simeone – Real Zaragoza – 2022–
Gustavo Siviero – Albacete – 2002–03
Franco Soldano – Fuenlabrada – 2021–
Leonardo Suárez – Mallorca – 2018–19
Alexander Szymanowski – Recreativo, Leganés – 2003–04
José Carlos Tabares – Castellón – 2005–10
Nicolás Tagliafico – Real Murcia – 2012–13
Nahuel Tenaglia – Deportivo Alavés – 2022–
Mariano Toedtli – Salamanca, Recreativo, Polideportivo Ejido, Cádiz – 2000–01, 2003–08, 2009–10
Diego Tonetto – Lugo – 2012–13
Lucas Trecarichi – Sevilla Atlético, Ponferradina – 2017–19
Óscar Trejo – Elche, Rayo Vallecano, Gijón – 2009–11, 2012–13, 2017–18, 2019–21
Diego Trotta – Las Palmas, Deportivo Alavés, Elche, Albacete – 2002–04, 2005–09
Valentín Vada – Almería – 2019–
Nahuel Valentini – Real Oviedo – 2017–18
Federico Varela – Rayo Majadahonda, Las Palmas – 2018–20
Matías Vargas – Espanyol – 2020–21
Federico Vega – Alcorcón, Lorca – 2015–18
Lucho Vega – Alcorcón – 2021–
Bruno Zuculini – Rayo Vallecano – 2016–17

Australia 
John Aloisi – Deportivo Alavés – 2006–07
David Carney – Alcorcón – 2011–12

Azerbaigian 
Eddy – Real Murcia, Córdoba, Cádiz, Gimnàstic, Alcorcón, Albacete – 2012–14, 2015–21
Vali Gasimov – Betis, Écija – 1992–94, 1996–97

Barbados 
 Nick Blackman – Gijón – 2018–19

Belarus 
Ihar Hurynovich – Castellón – 1993–94

Belgium 
Landry Dimata – Espanyol – 2020–21
 Ronny Gaspercic – CF Extremadura, Deportivo Alavés – 1999–2001, 2003–04
Andy Kawaya – Cartagena – 2021–
Ritchie Kitoko – Albacete, Granada, Tenerife, Girona, Real Jaén, UCAM Murcia, Racing Santander – 2007–09, 2010–11, 2012–14, 2016–17, 2019–20
Erwin Lemmens – Racing Santander – 2001–02
Jordan Lukaku – Ponferradina – 2022–
Charly Musonda – Levante – 2022–
Aristote Nkaka – Almería, Racing Santander – 2019–20
Largie Ramazani – Almería – 2020–

Bolivia 
Jaume Cuéllar – Lugo – 2021–
Leonardo Fernández – CF Extremadura – 2000–01
Samuel Galindo – Salamanca, Gimnàstic, Lugo – 2010–13
Juan Manuel Peña – Celta Vigo – 2007–09
Jairo Quinteros – Real Zaragoza – 2022–

Bosnia and Herzegovina 
Ermedin Demirović – Almería – 2018–19
Mirza Golubica – Xerez – 1990–91
Vladimir Gudelj – Celta Vigo, Compostela – 1991–92, 1999–2001
Eldin Hadžić – Hércules, Real Zaragoza, Elche – 2012–17
Anel Karabeg – Real Burgos, Eibar – 1989–91
Kenan Kodro – Osasuna – 2014–16
Simo Krunić – Marbella – 1994–96
Bojan Letić – Mirandés – 2020–22
Jovo Mišeljić – Badajoz – 1994–95
Borče Sredojević – Deportivo La Coruña – 1989–90
Miroslav Stevanović – Deportivo Alavés – 2013–14
Rade Tošić – CP Mérida, Castellón – 1992–94

Brazil 
Álvaro – Las Palmas – 2002–03
Reinaldo Alagoano – Huesca – 2009–10
Alexandre – Villarreal, Lorca Deportiva – 1994–98, 2005–07
Amaral – Las Palmas – 2008–09
Anderson – Fuenlabrada – 2021–
Vinícius Araújo – Huesca, Real Zaragoza – 2016–18
Arthuro – Gijón, Deportivo Alavés, Córdoba – 2004–05, 2006–08
Baiano – Rayo Vallecano – 2017–18
Baltazar – Celta Vigo – 1986–87
Flavio Barros – Racing de Ferrol – 2004–05
Pedro Botelho – Salamanca, Celta Vigo, Cartagena – 2007–11
Gabriel Brazão – Albacete, Real Oviedo – 2019–
William de Camargo – Cartagena – 2020–21
Canário – Mallorca – 1968–69
Thiago Carleto – Elche – 2009–10
Casemiro – Real Madrid Castilla – 2012–13
Charles – Pontevedra, Córdoba, Almería – 2004–05, 2010–13
Cléber – Cartagena – 2011–12
Yan Couto – Girona – 2020–21
Denílson – Betis – 2000–01
Dinei – Celta Vigo – 2008–09
Tiago Dutra – Villarreal B – 2010–12
Rodrigo Ely – Almería – 2021–
Emerson – Tenerife – 1998–99
Esquerdinha – Huesca, Hércules, Eibar – 2009–14
Evando – Villarreal – 1996–97
Fabão – Betis, Córdoba – 2000–02
Fabiano – Celta, Compostela – 1990–94, 1998–2001, 2002–03
Fabinho – Real Madrid Castilla – 2012–13
Felipe Manoel – Huesca, Levante, Villarreal B – 2008–10
Filipe Luís – Real Madrid Castilla – 2005–06
Daniel Fuzato – Ibiza – 2022–
Gabriel (Appelt Pires) – Leganés – 2015–16
Gabriel (Fernando Atz) – Gimnàstic – 2009–10
Gaúcho – Ourense – 1998–99
Pedro Geromel – Mallorca – 2013–14
Everton Giovanella – Salamanca, Celta Vigo – 1996–97, 2004–05
Giva – Llagostera – 2015–16
Marcinho Guerreiro – Real Murcia – 2008–09
Guilherme – Rayo Vallecano – 1994–95
Guina – Real Murcia, Tenerife, Elche – 1981–83, 1985–86, 1987–89, 1990–91
Iriney – Betis, Mallorca – 2009–11, 2013–14
Paulo Jamelli – Real Zaragoza, Almería – 2002–03, 2004–05
Rafael Jaques – Rayo Vallecano – 1999–2000
João Paulo (1980) – Tenerife – 2005–06
João Paulo (1981) – Ciudad Murcia – 2004–05
Joeano – Salamanca – 2003–04
Jonathan – Almería, Las Palmas – 2019–21
Jonathas – Elche – 2019–20
Kaká – Deportivo La Coruña – 2013–14
King – Atlético Madrid B – 1996–98
Derik Lacerda – Ponferradina – 2022–
Laionel – Salamanca – 2009–10
David Lopes – Córdoba – 2009–10
George Lucas – Celta Vigo – 2007–09
Michel Macedo – Almería – 2011–12, 2015–16
Edu Manga – Logroñés – 1999–2000
Marcelo – Deportivo Alavés – 1996–97
Marcos André – Mirandés, Real Valladolid – 2019–20, 2021–22
Matheus Aiás – Mirandés, Real Oviedo – 2019–20, 2021–
Magno Mocelin – Deportivo Alavés – 2003–04
Magrão – Badajoz – 1998–99
Rafael Martins – Levante – 2016–17
Mazinho – Elche – 2000–01
Túlio de Melo – Real Valladolid – 2014–15
Mosquito – Llagostera – 2015–16
Murilo – Gijón, Mallorca – 2019–21
Nenê – Deportivo Alavés – 2004–05
Ricardo Oliveira – Real Zaragoza – 2008–09
Pablo (de Barros Paulino) – Gimnàstic – 2009–10
Pablo (Filipe Teixeira) – Real Madrid Castilla – 2013–14
Paulinho – Córdoba – 2012–13
Marcelinho Paulista – Almería – 2003–04
Wellington Paulista – Deportivo Alavés – 2006–07
Paulo Vitor – Albacete – 2018–19
Matheus Pereira – Eibar – 2022–
Bruno Perone – Xerez, Gimnàstic, Real Zaragoza, Extremadura UD – 2010–11, 2016–19
Julio César Pinheiro – Logroñés – 1997–98
Bruno Pirri – Lugo – 2022–
César Prates – Real Madrid Castilla – 1996–97
Raí – Real Zaragoza – 2016–17, 2018–19
Rafinha – Barcelona B – 2010–13
Raudnei – Castellón – 1992–93
Renaldo – Las Palmas, Lleida, CF Extremadura – 1998–2002
Renan – Celta Vigo – 2008–09
Ivan Rocha – Real Valladolid, Atlético Madrid B, Elche – 1992–93, 1997–98, 2000–01
Adriano Rossato – Málaga, Salamanca – 2007–08, 2009–10
Rovérsio – Betis – 2010–11
Saulo – Celta Vigo – 2009–10
Guilherme Schettine – Almería – 2020–21
Sidnei – Las Palmas – 2022–
Rodrigo Silva – Huesca – 2009–10
Wellington Silva – Alcoyano, Ponferradina, Real Murcia – 2011–14
Roberto Sousa – Salamanca, Celta Vigo, Racing Ferrol – 2006–08
Adriano Teixeira – Salamanca – 1999–2001, 2002–03
Vitinho – Barcelona B – 2017–18
Wesley (Wesley Lopes da Silva) – Deportivo Alavés – 2006–07
Wesley (Wesley Moraes Ferreira da Silva) – Levante – 2022–
Xandão – Gijón – 2017–18
Yuri – Las Palmas, Ponferradina – 2007–08, 2010–11, 2012–16, 2019–
Zé Carlos – Ibiza – 2022–
Zé Ricardo – Lugo – 2022–

Bulgaria 
 Spas Delev – Las Palmas – 2013–14
Iliyan Kiryakov – Mérida – 1993–94
Petar Mihtarski – Mallorca – 1995–96
Vladimir Stoyanov – Deportivo La Coruña  – 1989–90

Burkina Faso 
Yacouba Coulibaly – Cartagena – 2020–21
Blati Touré – Córdoba – 2018–19

Cameroon 
Thimothée Atouba – Las Palmas – 2012–14
Macky Bagnack – Barcelona B, Real Zaragoza – 2012–15, 2016–17
Franck-Yves Bambock – Huesca, Córdoba – 2015–17, 2018–19
Víctor de Baunbag – Mallorca – 2018–19
Mohammed Djetei – Gimnàstic – 2016–19
Jean Marie Dongou – Barcelona B, Real Zaragoza, Gimnàstic, Lugo – 2011–19
Achille Emana – Betis, Gimnàstic – 2009–11, 2015–17
Stephane Emaná – Xerez, Gimnàstic – 2012–13, 2015–18
Yan Brice Eteki – Sevilla Atlético, Almería – 2017–19
David Eto'o – Ciudad Murcia – 2004–05
Samuel Eto'o – Leganés – 1997–98
Martin Hongla – Granada, Barcelona B – 2017–18
Jean Jules – Albacete – 2018–19
Raymond Kalla – CF Extremadura – 1999–2002
Wilfrid Kaptoum – Barcelona B, Almería – 2014–15, 2019–20
Daniel Kome – Atlético Madrid B, Levante, Numancia, Ciudad Murcia, Real Valladolid, Tenerife – 1999–2004, 2005–07, 2008–09, 2010–11
Pierre Kunde – Granada – 2017–18
Serge Leuko – Lugo – 2016–20
Raoul Loé – Osasuna – 2014–15
Cyrille Makanaky – Málaga, Villarreal – 1990–93
Stéphane Mbia – Fuenlabrada – 2021–22
Albert Meyong – Albacete – 2007–08
Serge N'Gal – Gimnàstic – 2008–10
Thomas N'Kono – Espanyol, Sabadell – 1989–90, 1991–93
Dani Ndi – Gijón – 2014–15
Yvan Neyou – Leganés – 2022–
Aloys Nong – Recreativo – 2013–14
Allan Nyom – Granada, Leganés – 2010–11, 2021–
Franck Omgba – Real Oviedo – 2015–16
Lucien Owona – Alcorcón, Almería – 2016–20
Patrick Soko – Huesca – 2022–
Franck Songo'o – Real Zaragoza, Real Sociedad, Albacete – 2008–11
Yann Songo'o – Sabadell – 2011–12

Canada 
Iain Hume – Ponferradina – 2015–16
Ballou Tabla – Barcelona B, Albacete – 2017–19

Cape Verde 
Bebé – Rayo Vallecano – 2017–18, 2019–21
Sandro Mendes – Hércules, Salamanca – 1997–2000
David Silva – Castellón – 2009–10

Central African Republic 
 Wilfried Zahibo – Gimnàstic – 2016–18

Chile 
Tomás Alarcón – Real Zaragoza – 2022–
Williams Alarcón – Ibiza – 2022–
Francisco Arrué – Leganés – 2003–04
Claudio Bravo – Real Sociedad – 2008–10
Matías Campos – Hércules – 2013–14
Gonzalo Collao – Extremadura UD – 2019–20
Pablo Contreras – Celta Vigo – 2004–05, 2007–08
César Cortés – Albacete – 2006–07
Juan Delgado – Gimnàstic – 2016–18
Lucas Domínguez –  Ponferradina – 2014–15
Felipe Gallegos – Recreativo – 2013–14
Ángelo Henríquez – Real Zaragoza – 2013–14
Manuel Iturra – Real Murcia – 2011–12
Ignacio Jeraldino – Gijón – 2022–
Igor Lichnovsky – Real Valladolid – 2016–17
Frank Lobos – Racing Ferrol – 2001–02
Nico Medina – Eibar, Huesca, Castellón – 2007–10
Mario Núñez – Salamanca – 2000–01
Fabian Orellana – Granada, Celta Vigo – 2010–12
Higinio Ortúzar – Real Valladolid, Real Sociedad – 1947–49
Jean Paul Pineda – Córdoba – 2015–16
Francisco Prieto – Mirandés, Ponferradina – 2013–15
Bryan Rabello – Deportivo La Coruña, Leganés  – 2013–15
Jaime Ramírez – Hospitalet – 1964–66
Lorenzo Reyes – Betis, Almería – 2014–16
Diego Rubio – Real Valladolid – 2015–16

China 
Gao Leilei – Extremadura UD – 2019–20
Wu Lei – Espanyol – 2020–21
Bernard Sun – Gimnàstic – 2018–19

Colombia 
Leonardo Acevedo – Logroñés – 2020–21
Abel Aguilar – Xerez, Hércules – 2006–09, 2011–12
Brayan Angulo – Rayo Vallecano – 2010–11
Anderson Arroyo – Mirandés – 2021–
Juan Camilo Becerra – Ponferradina – 2021–
Edward Bolaños – Ponferradina – 2020–21
Jorge Carrascal – Sevilla Atlético – 2016–17
Edwin Congo – Levante, Gijón – 2002–04, 2005–07
José de la Cuesta – Cádiz, Real Valladolid, Albacete – 2003–05, 2006–11
Juergen Elitim – Ponferradina, Racing Santander – 2020–21, 2022–
Bernardo Espinosa – Sevilla Atlético, Gijón, Girona – 2007–09, 2012–15, 2020–
Jonathan Estrada – Real Sociedad – 2009–10
Gabriel Fuentes – Real Zaragoza – 2022–
Lucho García – Ponferradina – 2021–
Cucho Hernández – Huesca – 2017–18
Carlos Daniel Hidalgo – Gijón – 2007–08
Fredy Hinestroza – Real Zaragoza – 2015–16
Juancho – Granada – 2018–19
Jefferson Lerma – Levante – 2016–17
Neyder Lozano – Elche – 2018–19
Jeison Medina – Real Zaragoza – 2018–19
Johan Mojica – Real Valladolid, Rayo Vallecano, Girona – 2014–17, 2019–20
Didier Moreno – Deportivo La Coruña  – 2018–19
Erik Moreno – Real Valladolid – 2015–16
Luis Muriel – Granada – 2010–11
Jeison Murillo – Las Palmas – 2012–13
Juanjo Narváez – Real Madrid Castilla, Córdoba, Almería, Las Palmas, Real Zaragoza – 2013–14, 2017–
Carlos Navarro Montoya – Tenerife – 1999–2000
Juan Sebastián Quintero – Gijón – 2017–18
Brayan Perea – Lugo – 2016–17
Edixon Perea – Las Palmas – 2010–11
Juan Sebastián Quintero – Gijón – 2017–18
Adrián Ramos – Granada – 2017–19
Hámilton Ricard – Numancia – 2005–06
Joao Rodríguez – Tenerife – 2018–19
Luis Suárez – Gimnàstic, Real Zaragoza – 2018–20
Dani Torres – Albacete, Real Zaragoza – 2018–21

Comoros 
 Rafidine Abdullah –  Cádiz – 2016–18

Congo 
Thievy Bifouma – Las Palmas – 2012–13
Dominique Malonga – Real Murcia, Elche – 2013–14, 2016–173
Merveil Ndockyt – Mallorca – 2018–19
Warren Tchimbembé – Mirandés – 2021–

Congo DR 
Jonathan Bijimine – Córdoba – 2015–17
Cedrick – Numancia, Betis, UCAM Murcia – 2010–13, 2014–15, 2016–17
Omenuke Mfulu – Elche, Las Palmas – 2019–20, 2021–

Costa Rica 
Danny Carvajal – Albacete – 2017–18
Luis Conejo – Albacete – 1990–91
Jonathan Moya – Huesca – 2015–16
Keylor Navas – Albacete – 2010–11

Croatia 
Ivica Barbarić – Real Burgos, Racing Santander, Badajoz, Almería – 1989–90, 1992–96
Roko Baturina – Racing Santander – 2022–
Mate Bilić – Almería, Gijón, Córdoba, Lleida – 2002–06, 2007–08, 2012–13
Luka Bonačić – CD Málaga – 1980–81
Milivoj Bračun – Elche – 1987–88
Ante Budimir – Mallorca – 2018–19, 2020–21
Dragoslav Čakić – Real Burgos, Xerez, Ourense – 1987–91, 1996–98
Ante Ćorić – Almería – 2019–20
Niko Datković – Mirandés – 2021–
Toni Datković – Huesca, Cartagena – 2019–20, 2021–
Davor Dželalija – Toledo – 1997–98
Tomislav Erceg – Levante – 1999–2000
Tomislav Gomelt – Lorca – 2017–18
Alen Halilović – Barcelona B – 2014–15
Miloš Hrstić – Deportivo La Coruña – 1985–86
Tomislav Ivković – Salamanca – 1996–97
Janko Janković – Hércules – 1995–96
Robert Jarni – Las Palmas – 1999–2000
Predrag Jurić – Real Burgos, Marbella, Mérida – 1989–90, 1992–95
Mario Meštrović – Deportivo Alavés – 1996–97
Nikica Milenković – Real Burgos, Sabadell – 1989–91
Antonio Milić – Rayo Vallecano – 2019–20
Mladen Mladenović – Castellón – 1991–93
Mladen Munjaković – Levante – 1990–91
Igor Musa – Xerez – 2002–04
Dubravko Pavličić – Hércules, Salamanca, Racing Ferrol – 1994–96, 1999–2001
Alen Peternac – Real Murcia, Real Zaragoza – 1981–83
Draženko Prskalo – CA Marbella – 1992–94
Davor Radmanović – Hércules – 1987–88
Boris Rapaić – Las Palmas – 2019–20
Mauro Ravnić – Lleida – 1992–93
Elvis Scoria – Lleida – 1997–98
Mate Šestan – Levante – 1997–98
Dragan Skočić – Las Palmas, Compostela – 1991–92, 1993–94
Luka Tudor – Sabadell – 1992–93

Cuba 
Christian Joel – Gijón – 2018–19, 2020–

Cyprus 
Ioannis Okkas – Celta Vigo – 2007–08

Czech Republic 
Alois Grussmann – Betis – 1991–92
Jiří Jarošík – Deportivo Alavés – 2013–15
Lukáš Juliš –  Ibiza – 2022–
Roman Kukleta – Betis – 1991–93
Tomáš Pekhart –  Las Palmas – 2018–20
Jiří Rosický – Atlético Madrid B – 1996–2000

Denmark 
Nicki Bille Nielsen – Villarreal B, Elche – 2010–12
Bo Braastrup Andersen – Las Palmas – 2002–03
Riza Durmisi – Leganés – 2022–
Andrew Hjulsager – Granada – 2017–18
Filip Jörgensen – Villarreal CF B – 2022–
Michael Krohn-Dehli – Deportivo La Coruña  – 2018–19
Magnus Troest – Recreativo – 2009–10

Dominican Republic 
Tano Bonnín – Osasuna  – 2015–16, 2017–18
Mariano Díaz – Real Madrid Castilla – 2013–14
Edipo – Numancia – 2014–15
Carlos Julio Martínez – Mirandés – 2019–21
Luismi Quezada – Córdoba, Cádiz – 2018–20

Ecuador 
Billy Arce – Extremadura UD – 2018–19
Mike Cevallos – Ibiza – 2021–
Pervis Estupiñán – Almería, Mallorca – 2017–19
Erick Ferigra – Las Palmas – 2021–
Jefferson Montero – Villarreal B – 2009–10
Gonzalo Plata – Real Valladolid – 2021–
Gustavo Quezada – Getafe – 2016–17
Kike Saverio – Ponferradina – 2021–
Liberman Torres – Villarreal B – 2022–
Joel Valencia – Alcorcón – 2021–

El Salvador 
 Mágico González – Cádiz – 1982–83, 1984–85
 Norberto Huezo – Palencia, Cartagena – 1982–85

England 
 Arvin Appiah – Almería, Lugo – 2019–
Miguel Azeez – Ibiza  – 2022–
Louie Donowa – Deportivo La Coruña  – 1985–89
David Hodgson – Xerez  – 1987–88
Charlie I'Anson – Alcorcón, Granada  – 2014–15, 2017–18
Marcus McGuane – Barcelona B – 2017–18
Armando Shashoua – Ibiza  – 2022–
Samuel Shashoua – Tenerife  – 2020–
Teddy Sutherland – Cartagena – 2020–21

Equatorial Guinea 
Carlos Akapo – Numancia, Huesca, Cádiz – 2013–14, 2016–18, 2019–20
Yago Alonso-Fueyo – Sporting Gijón, Oviedo, Celta Vigo, Cádiz, Levante – 1998–99, 2002–05, 2007–09
Álex Balboa – Deportivo Alavés – 2022–
Javier Balboa – Real Madrid Castilla, Cartagena, Albacete – 2005–06, 2009–11
Sergio Barila – Mérida, Levante – 1996–98
Rubén Belima – Real Madrid Castilla – 2013–14
Federico Bikoro – Lorca – 2017–18
Iván Bolado – Elche, Cartagena – 2008–09, 2011–12
Rodolfo Bodipo – Recreativo, Racing Santander, Deportivo Alavés, Deportivo La Coruña, Xerez  – 1998–2002, 2004–05, 2010–13
Jannick Buyla – Real Zaragoza – 2018–19
Saúl Coco – Las Palmas – 2020–
Juan Cuyami – Recreativo, Burgos – 1998–99, 2001–02
James Davis – Mallorca – 2015–17
Juvenal Edjogo-Owono – Levante, Deportivo Alavés, Recreativo, Tenerife, Cartagena, Sabadell – 2001–02, 2004–08, 2011–13
Juan Epitié – Recreativo Huelva, Alavés, Castellón – 2001–02, 2004–07
Raúl Fabiani – Alcoyano – 2011–12
Iban Iyanga – Las Palmas – 2008–09, 2010–12
Emilio Nsue – Castellón, Real Sociedad, Mallorca – 2008–10, 2013–14
Iban Salvador – Real Valladolid, UCAM Murcia, Cultural Leonesa, Fuenlabrada – 2016–18, 2019–22
José Luis Senobua – Almería – 1996–97
Benjamín Zarandona – Betis, Xerez – 2000–01, 2007–08
Iván Zarandona – Valladolid – 2004–05

Eritrea 
 Henok Goitom – Ciudad Murcia, Almería – 2005–07, 2011–12

Finland 
Robin Lod – Gijón – 2018–19
Pertti Jantunen – CD Málaga – 1977–78
Teemu Pukki – Sevilla Atlético – 2008–09
Berat Sadik – Gimnàstic – 2018–19

France 
Manuel Anatol – Atlético Madrid – 1932–33
Kévin Appin – Ibiza – 2021–
John-Christophe Ayina – Real Murcia – 2012–14
Karim Azamoum – Elche, Albacete – 2018–21
Hugo Bargas – Gimnàstic – 2011–12
Grégory Béranger – Racing Ferrol, Numancia, Las Palmas, Tenerife, Elche – 2005–08, 2009–13
Jérémy Blasco – Real Sociedad B – 2021–
Yann Bodiger – Córdoba, Cádiz, Castellón, Cartagena – 2018–
Nicolas Bonis – Deportivo Alavés – 2008–09
Bilal Boutobba – Sevilla Atletico – 2016–18
Flavien Enzo Boyomo – Albacete – 2020–
Rudy Carlier – Racing Ferrol, Eibar – 2007–09
Dominique Casagrande – Sevilla – 1997–98
Johann Charpenet – Racing Ferrol, Elche – 2007–08, 2009–10
Alexandre Coeff – Mallorca – 2014–15
Pierre Cornud – Sabadell, Real Oviedo – 2020–
Aly Coulibaly – Huesca – 2015–16
Pascal Cygan – Cartagena – 2009–11
Ludovic Delporte – Racing Ferrol, Albacete, Gimnàstic – 2001–03, 2010–11
Didier Digard – Lorca – 2017–18
Naïs Djouahra – Mirandés, Real Sociedad B – 2020–
Marc Fachan – Gimnàstic – 2009–10
Mickaël Gaffoor – Guadalajara, Numancia, Mirandés – 2011–16
Jimmy Giraudon – Leganés – 2021–
Antoine Griezmann – Real Sociedad – 2009–10
Haissem Hassan – Mirandés – 2021–
Jean-François Hernandez – Rayo Vallecano, Atlético Madrid – 1998–99, 2000–01
Koba Koindredi – Real Oviedo – 2022–
Brahim Konaté – Fuenlabrada – 2021–
Florian Lejeune – Villarreal B, Villarreal, Girona – 2011–13, 2014–16
Jérémy Lempereur – Alcorcón – 2010–11
David Linarès – Tenerife – 2004–05
Enzo Loiodice – Las Palmas – 2020–
Enzo Lombardo – Racing Santander, Huesca – 2019–20, 2021–
Jordan Lotiès – Osasuna – 2014–16
Peter Luccin – Real Zaragoza – 2008–09
David Mazzoncini – Las Palmas – 2002–03
Jérémy Mellot – Tenerife – 2021–
Florian Miguel – Huesca – 2021–
Randy Nteka – Fuenlabrada – 2019–21
Laurent de Palmas – Racing Ferrol, Almería, Elche – 2004–09
Noé Pamarot – Hércules – 2009–10, 2013–14
Franck Passi – Compostela – 1998–99
Michel Pavon – Betis – 2000–01
Jérémy Perbet – Villarreal – 2012–13
Michaël Pereira – Mallorca – 2013–16
Mathieu Peybernes – Gijón, Lugo, Almería, Real Zaragoza, Málaga – 2018–
Stéphane Pignol – Compostela, Almería, Real Murcia, Real Zaragoza, Las Palmas – 1999–2001, 2002–04, 2005–07, 2008–13
Jérôme Prior – Cartagena – 2021–
Modibo Sagnan – Mirandés – 2019–20
Nicolas Sahnoun – Almería – 2004–05
Matthieu Saunier – Granada – 2017–18
Franck Signorino – Cartagena – 2009–10
Florian Taulemesse – Sabadell – 2011–12
Philippe Toledo – Elche – 2005–07
Jonathan Varane – Gijón – 2022–
Karim Yoda – Getafe, Almería, Reus, Racing Santander – 2016–18, 2019–20
Enzo Zidane – Rayo Majadahonda, Almería – 2018–20
Luca Zidane – Racing Santander, Rayo Vallecano – 2019–21

Gabon 
 Lévy Madinda – Gimnàstic – 2015–17

Gambia 
 Bacari – Real Valladolid – 2010–11
Saidy Janko – Real Valladolid – 2021–
Aboubakary Kanté – Fuenlabrada – 2020–
Nuha Marong – Racing Santander – 2019–20
Sulayman Marreh – Almería – 2017–18

Georgia 
Giorgi Aburjania – Gimnàstic, Sevilla B, Lugo, Real Oviedo, Cartagena – 2015–19, 2020–21
Otar Kakabadze – Gimnàstic – 2016–19
Giorgi Makaridze – Almería – 2020–
Giorgi Papunashvili – Real Zaragoza, Racing Santander – 2017–21

Germany 
Johannes van den Bergh – Getafe – 2016–17
Danny Blum – Las Palmas – 2018–19
Francisco Copado – Mallorca – 1996–97
Patrick Ebert – Rayo Vallecano – 2016–17
Josef Elting – Real Murcia – 1975–76
Marco Haber – Las Palmas – 1998–99
Tobias Henneböle – Mallorca – 2015–16
Maikel Hermann – Toledo, Getafe, Compostela, Terrassa, Tenerife, Lorca Deportiva – 1998–99, 2000–01, 2002–07
Jochen Kientz – Mallorca – 1995–96
Markus Kreuz – Real Murcia – 2005–06
Alberto Méndez – Racing Ferrol, Terrassa – 2001–04
Danny Muller – Barcelona B – 1988–89
Shkodran Mustafi – Levante – 2022–
Gerhard Poschner – Rayo Vallecano, Polideportivo Ejido – 2000–03
Andreas Reinke – Real Murcia – 2001–03
Dani Schahin – Extremadura UD – 2018–19
Timon Wellenreuther – Mallorca – 2015–16

Ghana 
Sabit Abdulai – Extremadura UD – 2019–20
Kasim Adams – Mallorca – 2014–16
Lumor Agbenyenu – Málaga – 2022–
Michael Anaba – Elche – 2015–16
Emmanuel Attipoe – Extremadura UD – 2018–19
Tahiru Awudu – Fuenlabrada – 2020–21
Iddrisu Baba – Mallorca – 2018–19, 2020–21
Richard Boateng – Real Oviedo, Alcorcón, Cartagena – 2018–
Stephen Buer – Fuenlabrada – 2021–
Isaac Cofie – Gijón – 2018–19
Mohammed Dauda – Cartagena – 2021–
Emmanuel Duah – Mallorca – 1996–97
Raphael Dwamena – Real Zaragoza – 2019–20
Mohammed Fatau – Almería – 2015–16
Emmanuel Lomotey – Extremadura UD – 2019–20
Jonathan Mensah – Granada – 2010–11
Nana – Recreativo – 2014–15
Samuel Obeng – Real Oviedo – 2019–
David Odonkor – Betis – 2009–11
Ernest Ohemeng – Mirandés – 2019–20
Owusu – Real Oviedo – 2017–18
Sulley Muntari – Albacete – 2018–19
Thomas Partey – Mallorca, Almería – 2013–15
Brimah Razak – Guadalajara, Mirandés, Córdoba – 2012–13, 2014–17
Baba Sule – Mallorca, Ourense, Leganés –1996–2000, 2001–02
Mubarak Wakaso – Elche – 2008–11
Yaw Yeboah – Real Oviedo, Numancia – 2017–19

Greece 
Christos Albanis – FC Andorra – 2022–
Kostas Chalkias – Real Murcia – 2005–06
Giannis Gianniotas – Real Valladolid – 2017–18
Nikolaos Karabelas – Real Valladolid – 2015–16
Vassilis Lambropoulos – Deportivo La Coruña  – 2019–20
Nikolaos Michelis – Mirandés – 2022–
Georgios Samaras – Real Zaragoza – 2016–17

Guadeloupe 
Claudio Beauvue – Deportivo La Coruña – 2019–20

Guatemala 
Dwight Pezzarossi – Racing Ferrol, Numancia – 2002–03, 2005–07

Guinea 
Lass Bangoura – Rayo Vallecano, Almería, Lugo – 2010–11, 2016–18, 2019–20
Thierno Barry – Tenerife – 2021–22
Salifo Caropitche – Mirandés – 2022–
Seydouba Cissé – Leganés – 2021–
Sory Kaba – Elche – 2016–17, 2018–19
José Kanté – Gimnàstic – 2018–19
Alhassane Keita – Real Valladolid – 2010–11

Guinea-Bissau 
Admonio – Numancia – 2019–20
Lassana Camará – Real Valladolid – 2011–12
Salifo Caropitche – Mirandés – 2022–
Marcelo Djaló – Lugo, Extremadura UD – 2016–17, 2018–21
Carlos Embaló – Alcorcón – 2020–21
Edgar Ié – Barcelona B – 2012–15
Claudio Mendes – Las Palmas – 2019–22
Formose Mendy – Gijón – 2012–14

Haiti 
Frantz Bertin – Tenerife – 2005–06

Honduras 
Bryan Acosta – Tenerife – 2017–19
Jona – Real Jaén, Albacete, UCAM Murcia, Córdoba, Cádiz – 2013–14, 2015–18
Anthony Lozano – Alcoyano, Tenerife, Barcelona B, Girona, Cádiz – 2011–12, 2015–18, 2019–20

Hungary 
Béla Balogh – Real Murcia – 2008–09
László Dajka – Las Palmas – 1988–90
László Éger – Polideportivo Ejido – 2006–07
Patrik Hidi – Real Oviedo – 2017–18
Sándor Kiss – Cartagena – 1986–87
Gábor Korolovszky – CD Toledo – 1999–2000
Balázs Molnár – Elche – 1999–2000
Sándor Müller – Hércules – 1982–83
Andrej Prean Nagy – Las Palmas – 1952–54
Antal Nagy – Hércules – 1973–74, 1975–76
András Simon – Córdoba – 2009–10
József Szendrei – Málaga – 1987–88
Krisztián Vadócz – Deportivo Alavés – 2015–16

Iceland 
Magnús Bergs – Racing Santander – 1983–84
Diegui Johannesson – Real Oviedo – 2015–21

Iran 
Amir Abedzadeh – Ponferradina – 2021–
Karim Ansarifard – Osasuna – 2014–15
Javad Nekounam – Osasuna – 2014–15
Masoud Shojaei – Las Palmas – 2013–14

Israel 
Dudu Aouate – Mallorca – 2013–14
Gal Arel – Gimnàstic – 2015–16
Gai Assulin – Hércules, Granada, Mallorca – 2012–15
Dudu Biton – Alcorcón – 2013–14
Tomer Hemed – Mallorca, Almería – 2013–15
Eial Strahman – Córdoba – 2013–14
Idan Tal – CP Mérida – 1999–2000
Nikos Vergos – Elche – 2015–16
Shon Weissman – Real Valladolid – 2021–

Italy 
Federico Barba – Gijón – 2017–18
Giuseppe Baronchelli – Albacete – 1998–99
Rolando Bianchi – Mallorca – 2015–16
Riccardo Capellini – Mirandés – 2021–
Leonardo Capezzi – Albacete – 2019–20
Lorenzo Crisetig – Mirandés – 2019–20
Nicolao Dumitru – Alcorcón, Gimnàstic – 2017–19
Diego Fabbrini – Real Oviedo – 2017–18
Salvatore Giunta – Albacete – 1997–98
Paolo Gozzi – Fuenlabrada – 2021–
Pietro Iemmello – Las Palmas – 2020–21
Samuele Longo – Girona, Tenerife, Deportivo La Coruña – 2016–18, 2019–20
Marco Motta – Almería – 2016–18
Cristiano Piccini – Betis – 2014–15
Alessandro Pierini – Córdoba – 2004–05
Federico Piovaccari – Córdoba, Rayo Vallecano – 2016–17, 2018–20
Vincenzo Rennella – Córdoba, Lugo, Betis, Real Valladolid, Extremadura UD, Cádiz – 2012–16, 2018–19
Antonio Rizzolo – Albacete – 1998–99
Antonio Rozzi  – Real Madrid Castilla – 2013–14
Edoardo Soleri – Almería – 2017–18
Michele Somma – Deportivo La Coruña  – 2018–20
Luca Zanimacchia – Real Zaragoza – 2020–21

Ivory Coast 
Bobley Anderson – Alcorcón – 2014–15
Axel Bamba – Gijón – 2022–
Djakaria Barro – Cartagena – 2022–
Ibrahim Diabate – Mallorca – 2020–21
Jacques Dago – Fuenlabrada – 2021–
Jean Armel Drolé – Las Palmas – 2019–20
Félix Dja Ettien – Levante – 1997–98, 1999–2004, 2005–06
Cheick Doukouré – Huesca, Leganés – 2019–20, 2021–
Lago Junior – Numancia, Mirandés, Mallorca, Huesca – 2009–10, 2011–13, 2015–17, 2018–19, 2020–
Idrissa Keita – Levante, Real Oviedo, Algeciras, Racing Ferrol – 1997–98, 2002–04, 2007–08
Mamadou Koné – Racing Santander, Real Oviedo, Málaga, Deportivo La Coruña – 2012–13, 2014–16, 2018–20
Jean Luc – Gimnàstic – 2015–18
Giovanni Sio – Real Sociedad – 2008–09
Ibrahim Sissoko – Deportivo La Coruña  – 2013–14
Cheick Timité – Fuenlabrada – 2021–

Jamaica 
 Deshorn Brown – Lorca – 2017–18

Japan 
Taichi Hara – Deportivo Alavés – 2022–
Ariajasuru Hasegawa – Real Zaragoza – 2015–16
Kento Hashimoto – Huesca – 2022–
Hiroshi Ibusuki – Girona – 2008–09
Yosuke Ideguchi – Cultural Leonesa – 2017–18
Shinji Kagawa – Real Zaragoza – 2019–20
Shinji Okazaki – Huesca, Cartagena – 2019–20, 2021–
Gaku Shibasaki – Tenerife, Deportivo La Coruña, Leganés – 2016–17, 2019–
Yukiya Sugita – Hércules – 2013–15
Daisuke Suzuki – Gimnàstic – 2015–18
Sotan Tanabe – Sabadell – 2013–15
Louis Yamaguchi – Extremadura UD – 2019–20

Kenya 
Ismael Athuman – Las Palmas – 2020–21
McDonald Mariga – Real Oviedo – 2017–18

Kosovo 
Arijanet Muric – Girona – 2020–21

Liberia 
 William Jebor – Ponferradina – 2015–16

Lithuania 
Marius Stankevičius – Córdoba – 2015–16

Malaysia 
Natxo Insa – Eibar, Villarreal B, Celta Vigo, Real Zaragoza, Alcorcón, Levante – 2007–12, 2014–17

Mali 
Adama – Gijón – 2012–13
Binke Diabaté – Numancia – 2016–17
Moussa Diarra – Málaga – 2022–
Issa Fomba – Málaga – 2020–21
Ibrahima Kebe – Girona – 2019–22
Sidi Yaya Keita – Xerez – 2012–13
Aly Mallé – Lorca – 2017–18
Hadi Sacko – Las Palmas – 2018–19
Moussa Sidibé – Ponferradina – 2020–21
Abdoul Sissoko – Hércules, Mallorca – 2013–14, 2015–16
Sumy – Albacete – 2010–11

Martinique 
Grégory – Gijón – 2012–13
Jean-Sylvain Babin – Alcorcón, Gijón – 2010–14, 2018–
Samuel Camille – Rayo Vallecano, Córdoba CF, Alcorcón, Ponferradina, Tenerife – 2009–11, 2012–19
Mickaël Malsa – Albacete, Mirandés – 2018–

Mauritania 
Aly Abeid – Alcorcón – 2018–19
Dawda Camara – Girona – 2021–22
Hacen – Lugo – 2019–21, 2022–
Abdallahi Mahmoud – Deportivo Alavés – 2022–
Idrissa Thiam – Lugo – 2022–

Mexico 
Daniel Alonso Aceves – Real Oviedo – 2022–
Oswaldo Alanís – Real Oviedo – 2018–19
Javier Aquino – Villareal – 2012–13
Jordan Carrillo – Gijón – 2022–
Ulises Dávila – Sabadell, Córdoba, Tenerife – 2012–15
Marcelo Flores – Real Oviedo – 2022–
Andrés Guardado – Deportivo La Coruña – 2011–12
Javier Iturriaga – Salamanca – 2007–08
Antonio de Nigris – Polideportivo Ejido – 2003–04
Jonathan dos Santos – Barcelona B – 2010–12
Juan Ángel Seguro – Real Unión – 2009–10

Montenegro 
Marko Bakić – Alcorcón – 2016–17
Dejan Batrović – Getafe, Ourense, Xerez – 1995–98
Zoran Batrović – Deportivo La Coruña – 1989–90
Boris Cmiljanić – Huesca – 2016–17
Andrija Delibašić – Real Sociedad, Hércules, Rayo Vallecano – 2007–11
Ardian Đokaj – Lleida – 2000–01
Luka Đorđević – Ponferradina – 2015–16
Zdravko Drinčić – Osasuna – 1995–96
Uroš Đurđević – Gijón – 2018–
Igor Gluščević – CF Extremadura, Sevilla – 1997–99
Sead Hakšabanović – Málaga – 2018–19
Ivan Kecojević – Cádiz, Albacete – 2017–21
Miodrag Kustudić – Mallorca – 1981–83
Bogdan Milić – Osasuna – 2015–16
Vukan Perović – Elche – 1980–81
Esteban Saveljich – Almería, Levante, Albacete, Rayo Vallecano – 2015–21
Nikola Šipčić – Tenerife – 2019–

Morocco 
Haitam Abaida – Málaga – 2020–
Abdel Abqar – Deportivo Alavés – 2022–
Abdel Al Badaoui – Alcorcón – 2021–22
Nabil Baha – Racing Ferrol, Ponferradina, Málaga, Sabadell – 2005–08, 2011–13
Abdelaziz Barrada – Gimnàstic – 2018–19
Zakarya Bergdich – Real Valladolid, Córdoba – 2014–15, 2016–17
Yassine Bounou "Bono" – Real Zaragoza, Girona – 2014–17
Badr Boulahroud – Málaga – 2018–21
Mohamed Bouldini – Fuenlabrada, Levante – 2021–
Ouasim Bouy – Cultural Leonesa – 2017–18
Soufiane Chakla – Ponferradina – 2022–
Omar El Hilali – Espanyol – 2020–21
Abdeljalil Hadda – Gijón – 1998–2001
Hicham – Málaga – 2018–22
Jawad El Yamiq – Real Zaragoza – 2019–20
Ayoub Jabbari – Racing de Santander – 2022–
Jaco – UD España, Rayo Vallecano, Racing de Ferrol – 1953–55, 1958–60
Moha (Sanhaji Brahmi) – Numancia – 2019–20
Moha (Mohamed Ezzarfani) – Mirandés – 2020–21
Moha (Rharsalla) – Gimnàstic – 2016–17
Mourad – Elche – 2019–20
Munir – Numancia, Málaga – 2014–20
Yacine Qasmi – Elche, Rayo Vallecano, Leganés – 2018–
Adil Ramzi – Córdoba – 2002–03
Chadi Riad – Sabadell – 2020–21
Ousama Siddiki – Logroñés – 2020–21
Anuar Tuhami – Real Valladolid – 2015–18
Zaki – Mallorca – 1988–89

Netherlands 
Yassine Abdellaoui – Rayo Vallecano – 1997–98
Kiran Bechan – Hércules – 2007–08
Lucas Bijker – Cádiz – 2017–18
Hector Hevel – Andorra – 2022–
Jeffrey Hoogervorst – Gijón, Real Madrid Castilla – 2003–07
Jens Janse – Córdoba – 2013–14
Rajiv van La Parra – Logroñés – 2020–21
Riga Mustapha – Levante, Cartagena – 2005–06, 2010–11
Junas Naciri – Lugo – 1992–93
Tarik Oulida – Sevilla – 1997–98
René Ponk – Compostela – 1998–2000
Berry Powel – Gimnàstic, Elche – 2010–13
Jeffrey Sarpong – Hércules – 2012–13
Romano Sion – Compostela – 1998–2001
Gianni Zuiverloon – Cultural Leonesa – 2017–18

Niger 
 Yacouba Hamani – Ponferradina – 2019–21

Nigeria 
Mutiu Adepoju – Real Madrid Castilla, Racing Santander, Salamanca – 1991–93, 2001–02
Uche Henry Agbo – Deportivo La Coruña – 2019–20
Wilfred Agbonavbare – Rayo Vallecano, Écija – 1990–92, 1994–95, 1996–97
Festus Agu – Ourense – 1996–97
Mikel Agu – Fuenlabrada – 2021–
Kabiru Akinsola – Salamanca – 2008–10
Emmanuel Amunike – Albacete – 2000–02
Emmanuel Apeh – Lorca – 2017–18
Ramon Azeez – Almería, Lugo, Granada, Cartagena – 2012–13, 2015–19, 2020–
Haruna Babangida – Barcelona B, Terrassa, Cádiz – 1998–99, 2002–04
Macauley Chrisantus – Las Palmas, Reus – 2012–14, 2016–17
James Igbekeme – Real Zaragoza – 2018–
Odion Ighalo – Granada – 2010–11
Abass Lawal – Atlético Madrid B, Atlético Madrid, Córdoba, Leganés, Xerez – 1997–2003, 2004–05
Kelechi Nwakali – Huesca, Alcorcón – 2019–
Nwankwo Obiora – Córdoba – 2013–14
Michael Obiku – Mallorca – 1996–97
Bartholomew Ogbeche – Deportivo Alavés, Cádiz, Xerez – 2006–07, 2009–10, 2012–13
Christopher Ohen – Real Madrid Castilla, Compostela,Leganés  – 1989–90, 1991–94, 2000–02
Kenneth Omeruo – Leganés – 2020–
Cedric Omoigui – Mallorca – 2014–15, 2016–17
Valentine Ozornwafor – Almería – 2019–
Umar Sadiq – Almería – 2020–
Stephen Sunday – Polideportivo Ejido, Betis, Numancia – 2005–07, 2009–13
Ikechukwu Uche – Racing Ferrol, Recreativo, Villarreal, Gimnàstic – 2001–06, 2012–13, 2016–19
Kalu Uche – Almería – 2005–07, 2015–17
Francis Uzoho – Elche – 2018–19

North Macedonia 
Boban Babunski – Lleida, Logroñés – 1994–96, 1999–2000
David Babunski – Barcelona B – 2013–15
Stole Dimitrievski – Gimnàstic, Rayo Vallecano – 2016–18, 2019–
Aleksandar Trajkovski – Mallorca – 2020–

Norway 
 André Schei Lindbæk – Numancia, Las Palmas – 2002–04
 Håvard Nordtveit – Salamanca – 2008–09

Palestine 
 Daniel Mustafá – Huesca – 2009–10

Panama 
Édgar Bárcenas – Real Oviedo, Girona, Leganés – 2018–
Adalberto Carrasquilla – Cartagena – 2020–
Fidel Escobar – Alcorcón – 2020–
Rommel Fernández – Tenerife – 1987–89
Blas Pérez – Hércules – 2007–08
Alberto Quintero – Cartagena – 2009–10
José Luis Rodríguez – Lugo – 2020–
César Yanis – Real Zaragoza – 2021–

Paraguay 
Javier Acuña – Cádiz, Salamanca, Recreativo, Girona, Mallorca, Numancia, Albacete – 2006–08, 2010–13, 2015–20
Roberto Acuña – Elche – 2003–04
Angel Amarilla – Getafe, Badajoz – 2000–02
Saturnino Arrúa – Real Zaragoza – 1977–78
José Aveiro – Valencia Mestalla, Ontinyent, Constància – 1961–63, 1964–66
Epifanio Benítez – Elche – 1978–79
Miguel Ángel Benítez – Mérida, Almería – 1994–95, 2003–04
Eufemio Cabral – Racing Santander, Hércules, Lorca – 1979–80, 1982–85
Sergio Díaz – Lugo – 2017–18
Pedro Fernández – Granada – 1976–78
Felipe Nery Franco – Elche – 1982–84
Jonathan David Gómez – Real Murcia – 2012–13
Carlos González – Lleida – 2000–01
Julio Irrazábal – Hércules – 2006–07
Dante López – Córdoba – 2003–04
Líder Mármol – Hércules – 2006–07
Roberto Merino – Málaga B, Ciudad Murcia – 2003–05
Hernán Pérez – Villarreal B, Villarreal, Real Valladolid – 2009–11, 2012–13, 2014–15
Claudio Morel Rodríguez – Deportivo La Coruña – 2011–12
Jorge Amado Nunes – Elche – 1986–87
Danilo Ortíz – Elche – 2019–20
José Parodi – Las Palmas – 1960–61
Isidro Pitta – Huesca – 2021–
Antonio Sanabria – Barcelona B – 2013–14
Delio Toledo – Real Zaragoza – 2002–03
Aureliano Torres – Real Murcia – 2005–06
Carlos Luis Torres – Badajoz, Real Jaén – 1995–2002

Peru 
Luis Advíncula – Rayo Vallecano – 2019–
Santiago Acasiete – Almería – 2005–07, 2011–12
Cristian Benavente – Real Madrid Castilla – 2013–15
Alexander Callens – Numancia – 2015–17
Guillermo Delgado – Cádiz – 1963–64
Aldair Fuentes – Fuenlabrada – 2020–
Damián Ísmodes – Eibar – 2008–09
Jeisson Martínez – Rayo Majadahonda, Fuenlabrada – 2018–20
Máximo Mosquera – Atlético Baleares, Cádiz – 1961–63
Andy Pando – Las Palmas – 2012–13
Sergio Peña – Granada – 2017–18
Miguel Rebosio – Real Zaragoza – 2002–03
Jean-Pierre Rhyner – Cádiz – 2019–20
Beto da Silva – Deportivo La Coruña – 2019–20

Philippines 
José Ángel Carrillo – Real Murcia, Sevilla B, Cádiz, Córdoba, Lugo – 2013–14, 2016–
Ángel Guirado – Córdoba, Vecindario – 2004–05, 2006–07
Javier Patiño – Córdoba, Xerez – 2011–13
Álvaro Silva – Málaga, Xerez, Cádiz – 2006–10, 2011–13

Poland 
Mateusz Bogusz – Logroñés, Ibiza – 2020–
Paweł Brożek – Recreativo – 2012–13
Marcin Bułka – Cartagena – 2020–21
Paweł Kieszek – Córdoba – 2016–18
Kamil Kosowski – Cádiz – 2007–08
Wojciech Kowalczyk – Las Palmas – 1997–99
Piotr Parzyszek – Leganés – 2022–
Damien Perquis – Betis – 2014–15
Jerzy Podbrożny – Mérida, Toledo – 1996–98
Adrian Sikora – Real Murcia – 2008–09
Mirosław Trzeciak – Osasuna, Polideportivo Ejido – 1998–2000, 2001–02

Portugal 
João Afonso – Córdoba – 2017–18
Nuno Afonso – Salamanca – 1996–97
Joaquim Agostinho – Real Madrid Castilla, Salamanca, Las Palmas, Málaga, Polideportivo Ejido – 1995–99, 2003–04
Salvador Agra – Granada, Cádiz – 2017–19
Marco Almeida – Ciudad Murcia – 2004–05
Luis Andrade – Tenerife – 2003–04
Kévin Appin – Ibiza – 2021–
Jorge Araújo – Recreativo – 2013–14
Hélder Baptista – Rayo Vallecano – 2003–04
Bino – Tenerife – 2002–03
César Brito – Salamanca, Mérida – 1996–97, 1998–99
Bruno Tiago – Salamanca, Mérida – 2001–02
Agostinho Cá – Barcelona B, Girona – 2012–15
David Caiado – Ponferradina  – 2015–16
Bruno Caires – Tenerife – 1999–2000
José Calado – Polideportivo Ejido – 2003–07
Daniel Candeias – Recreativo – 2009–10
Capucho – Celta Vigo – 2004–05
Carlitos – Polideportivo Ejido – 2003–04
Daniel Carriço – Almería – 2021–22
Nuno Carvalho – Lleida – 2005–06
Zé Castro – Deportivo La Coruña, Rayo Vallecano – 2011–12, 2016–17
Fábio Coentrão – Real Zaragoza – 2008–09
Constantino – Levante – 1999–2000
João Costa – Mirandés – 2019–20
Rui Costa – Alcorcón – 2019–20
Samuel Costa – Almería – 2020–22
Paulo Costinha – Tenerife – 1999–2000
Vítor Damas – Racing Santander – 1979–80
Dani – Atlético Madrid – 2000–02
Domingos Duarte – Deportivo La Coruña – 2018–19
Duda – Levante – 2002–03
Edgar – Málaga, Getafe – 1998–99, 2002–03, 2006–07
Eliseu – Málaga – 2007–08
Nuno Espírito Santo – CP Mérida – 1998–2000
Fábio Faria – Real Valladolid – 2010–11
André Ferreira – Granada – 2022–
Ivanildo Fernandes – Almería – 2020–21
Julien Fernandes – Cartagena – 2010–12
Vasco Fernandes – Salamanca, Celta Vigo, Elche – 2007–08, 2009–11
Marco Ferreira – Atlético Madrid B – 1997–98
Fininho – Málaga B – 2004–05
João Fonseca – Ourense – 1973–75
Carlos Freire – Celta – 1986–87
Bruno Gama – Deportivo La Coruña, Alcorcón  – 2011–12, 2013–14, 2017–18
Miguel Garcia – Mallorca – 2013–14
André Geraldes – Gijón – 2018–19
Tiago Gomes – Hércules – 2009–10, 2011–12
Gui Guedes – Lugo – 2022–
Raphael Guzzo – Reus – 2016–18
Hernâni – Las Palmas – 2021–
Igor – Girona, Levante, Tenerife – 2008–11
Jair – Huesca – 2016–18
Daniel Kenedy – Albacete – 1998–99
Hugo Leal – Atlético Madrid, Salamanca – 2000–01, 2009–10
André Leão – Real Valladolid – 2014–17
Luís Gustavo Ledes – Barcelona B, Reus, Numancia, Castellón – 2010–13, 2017–21
Licá – Granada – 2017–18
Miguel Lopes – Betis – 2010–11
Luisinho – Deportivo La Coruña, Huesca – 2013–14, 2019–20
Ariza Makukula – Salamanca, Leganés – 2000–02
Luís Martins – Osasuna – 2015–16
Mano – Villarreal B – 2010–12
Marcos Paulo – Mirandés – 2022–
Francisco Mascarenhas – Real Oviedo – 2022–
Diogo Matos – Las Palmas – 2002–03
Pedro Mendes – Almería – 2020–21
Florian Miguel – Huesca – 2021–
Thierry Moutinho – Albacete, Mallorca, Tenerife, Cultural Leonesa – 2013–18
Nélson – Betis, Alcorcón – 2009–10, 2015–17
Aldair Neves – Ponferradina – 2022–
José Nunes – Mallorca – 2013–14
Pauleta – Salamanca – 1996–97
Paulo Jorge – Málaga – 2007–08
Paulo Sérgio – Salamanca – 2008–09
André Pereira – Real Zaragoza – 2019–20
Tiago Pereira – Rayo Vallecano, Tenerife – 1998–2000
Vítor Pereira – CF Extremadura – 2000–02
Nuno Pina – Fuenlabrada – 2021–
João Pinto – Atlético Madrileño – 1989–91
João Manuel Pinto – Real Murcia – 2003–04
Tiago Pinto – Racing Santander – 2012–13
Diogo Queirós – Real Valladolid – 2021–
Reko – Alcorcón – 2019–
Nuno Rodrigues – Badajoz – 2002–03
Pêpê Rodrigues – Cartagena – 2022–
Hélder Rosário – Málaga – 2007–08
Josué Sá – Huesca – 2019–20
Orlando Sá – Málaga – 2020–
Diogo Salomão – Deportivo La Coruña, Mallorca – 2011–12, 2013–14, 2015–17
Renato Santos – Málaga – 2018–20
Ricardo Schutte – Mirandés – 2020–
Henrique Sereno – Almería – 2016–17
Silas – Elche – 1999–2000
Mário Silva – Recreativo – 2004–05
Rui Silva – Granada – 2017–19
Vítor Silva – Reus, Deportivo La Coruña – 2016–19
André Sousa – Gijón – 2018–19
Dyego Sousa – Almería – 2021–22
Alfonso Taira – Córdoba – 2011–12
José Taira – Salamanca, Sevilla – 1996–97, 1999–2001
Heriberto Tavares – Ponferradina – 2022–
Paulo Teles – Deportivo La Coruña – 2013–14
Pedro Tiba – Real Valladolid – 2015–16
Paulo Torres – Salamanca, Rayo Vallecano, Leganés – 1996–97, 1998–2000
Tulipa – Badajoz – 2000–02
Bruno Varela – Real Valladolid – 2015–16
Ricardo Vaz – Reus – 2016–19
Frederico Venâncio – Lugo – 2020–
Diogo Verdasca – Real Zaragoza – 2017–19
Rúben Vezo – Levante – 2022–
Miguel Vieira – Lugo – 2018–19
Bruno Wilson – Tenerife – 2020–
Zé Carlos – Ibiza – 2022–

Puerto Rico 
Leandro Antonetti – Lugo – 2021–

Qatar 
 Ahmed Yasser – Cultural Leonesa – 2017–18

Republic of Ireland 
 Ian Harte – Levante – 2005–06

Romania 
Florin Andone – Córdoba – 2015–16
Ioan Andone – Elche – 1990–91
Paul Anton – Getafe – 2016–17
Constantin Barbu – Numancia – 2001–02
Daniel Baston – Compostela – 1998–99
Miodrag Belodedici – Villarreal – 1995–96
Gheorghe Craioveanu – Villarreal, Getafe  – 1999–2000, 2002–04
Ovidiu Cuc – Mérida, Atlético Marbella – 1993–96
Ionel Dănciulescu – Hércules – 2009–10
Marin Dună – Logroñés – 1997–98
Constantin Gâlcă – Mallorca, Zaragoza, Almería – 1996–97, 2002–06
Ionel Gane – Osasuna – 1996–98
Cristian Ganea – Numancia – 2018–19
Dinu Moldovan – Ponferradina – 2013–16
Cătălin Munteanu – Salamanca, Albacete, Real Murcia – 1999–2001, 2002–03, 2004–05
Răzvan Ochiroșii – Alcorcón – 2015–17
Alex Pașcanu – Ponferradina – 2020–
Razvan Popa – Real Zaragoza – 2016–17
Răzvan Raț – Rayo Vallecano – 2016–18
Andrei Rațiu – Huesca – 2021–
Laurențiu Roșu – Numancia, Recreativo – 2001–06
Dennis Șerban – Villarreal, Elche, Córdoba, Polideportivo Ejido – 1999–2001, 2002–04
Bogdan Stelea – Mallorca, Salamanca – 1992–93, 1999–2004

Russia 
 Denis Cheryshev – Real Madrid Castilla – 2012–13
 Dmitri Cheryshev – Gijón, Burgos – 1998–2002
Sergey Dmitriyev – Xerez – 1990–91
Ilshat Fayzulin – Villarreal, Getafe – 1997–98, 2000–01
Dmitri Galiamin – Español, Mérida – 1993–95
Nikita Iosifov – Villarreal CF B – 2022–
Andrey Kobelev – Betis – 1992–94
Igor Korneev – Español – 1993–94
Dmitri Kuznetsov – Español, Lleida, Deportivo Alavés, Osasuna – 1993–97
Igor Lediakhov – Gijón, Eibar – 1998–2003
Andrei Mokh – Toledo, Leganés – 1993–96, 1997–98
Aleksandr Mostovoi – Deportivo Alavés – 2004–05
Viktor Onopko – Real Oviedo – 2001–02
Dmitri Popov – Compostela, Toledo – 1998–2000
Dmitri Radchenko – Compostela – 1998–99
Oleg Salenko – Córdoba – 1999–2000
Anton Shvets – Real Zaragoza – 2013–14
Igor Simutenkov – Tenerife – 1999–2001

Scotland 
Ikechi Anya – Celta Vigo – 2010–11
Steve Archibald – Espanyol – 1989–90
Ryan Harper – Guadalajara – 2011–12
Jack Harper – Málaga, Alcorcón, Cartagena – 2018–21
Jim Steel – Deportivo La Coruña – 1986–87

Senegal 
Amath – Tenerife – 2016–17
Abdoulaye Ba – Rayo Vallecano, Deportivo La Coruña – 2017–18, 2019–
Ibrahima Baldé – Numancia, Real Oviedo – 2010–11, 2018–
Amadou Boiro – Gimnàstic – 2016–17
Pathé Ciss – Fuenlabrada – 2019–
Pape Diamanka – Leganés, Real Zaragoza, Almería, Numancia, Girona – 2014–
Mohamed Diamé – Rayo Vallecano – 2008–09
Famara Diédhiou – Granada – 2022–
Papakouli Diop – Gimnàstic – 2008–09
Mamadou Fall – Villarreal B – 2022–
Sekou Gassama – Almería, Fuenlabrada – 2019–
Makhtar Gueye – Real Zaragoza – 2022–
Nicolas Jackson – Mirandés – 2020–21
Khalifa Sankaré – Cádiz – 2016–18
Mamadou Sylla – Racing Santander, Girona – 2015–16, 2020–
Ousseynou Thioune – Gimnàstic – 2018–19

Serbia 
Ivan Adžić – Toledo – 1997–98
Miodrag Anđelković – Almería – 1996–97
Srđan Babić – Reus, Almería – 2016–17, 2021–
Branislav Bajić – Xerez – 2003–08
Rahim Beširović – Lleida – 1996–98
Dragiša Binić – Levante – 1989–90
Goran Bogdanović – Mallorca, CF Extremadura – 1993–95, 1997–98
Miloš Bogunović – Cádiz – 2009–10
Rajko Brežančić – Huesca – 2016–18
Nikola Čumić – Gijón – 2020–
Ranko Despotović – Real Murcia, Salamanca, Girona, Deportivo Alavés – 2008–11, 2014–15
Petar Divić – Toledo – 1996–97
Marko Dmitrović – Alcorcón – 2015–17
Goran Đorović – Elche – 2003–04
Dejan Dražić – Real Valladolid – 2016–17
Goran Drulić – Barcelona B, Real Zaragoza – 1996–97, 2002–03
Ratomir Dujković – Real Oviedo – 1974–75, 1976–77
Nenad Đukanović – Hércules – 1998–99
Miroslav Đukić – Deportivo La Coruña, Tenerife – 1990–91, 2003–04
Ivan Đurđević – Ourense – 1998–99
Milan Đurđević – Mallorca – 1994–95
Ranko Golijanin – Hércules – 2007–08
Nenad Grozdić – Racing Ferrol – 2001–02
Nebojša Gudelj – Logroñés, Leganés – 1995–97
Nikola Gulan – Mallorca – 2014–15
Aleksandar Ilić – Cádiz – 1993–94
Dragan Isailović – Burgos – 2001–03
Goran Jezdimirović – Écija – 1996–97
Slaviša Jokanović – Ciudad Murcia – 2003–04
Aleksandar Jovanović – Deportivo La Coruña – 2019–20
Đorđe Jovanović – Cádiz – 2018–19
Saša Jovanović – Córdoba, Deportivo La Coruña – 2017–20
Milovan Jović – Elche – 1981–82
Željko Kalajdžić – Logroñés – 1999–2000
Andrija Kaluđerović – Racing Santander – 2012–13
Goran Kopunović – Figueres – 1992–93
Bojan Krkić Sr. – Mollerussa – 1988–89
Dejan Lekić – Gijón, Girona, Mallorca, Reus, Cádiz – 2013–14, 2015–19
Dragoje Leković – Málaga – 1998–99
Leo Lerinc – Ciudad Murcia – 2003–05
Vladan Lukić – Marbella – 1994–95
Filip Malbašić – Tenerife, Cádiz, Burgos – 2017–20, 2021–
Nikola Maraš – Almería – 2019–21
Goran Marić – Celta Vigo, Barcelona B, Real Unión – 2007–10
Zoran Marić – Celta Vigo, Salamanca – 1990–93
Nebojša Marinković – Gimnàstic – 2008–09
Dejan Marković – Figueres, Logroñés, Osasuna – 1992–93, 1995–96, 1997–2000
Filip Marković – Mallorca – 2014–15
Saša Marković – Córdoba – 2015–18
Dušan Mijić – Palamós – 1992–93
Milan Milijaš – Málaga – 1998–99
Goran Milojević – Mérida, Mallorca, Villarreal – 1991–95, 1996–98
Goran Milosević – Lleida, Real Jaén – 1997–98, 1999–2002
Uroš Milovanović – Gijón – 2022–
Nenad Mirosavljević – Cádiz – 2004–05
Zdenko Muf – Badajoz – 1996–97
Albert Nađ – Elche, Real Oviedo – 2000–02
Zoran Njeguš – Atlético Madrid – 2000–01
Dejan Osmanović – CF Extremadura – 1998–99
Aleksandar Pantić – Lugo – 2022–
Veljko Paunović – CA Marbella, Atlético Madrid, Tenerife – 1995–96, 2000–01, 2002–03
Marko Perović – Gijón – 1998–2000
Dušan Petković – Mallorca, Écija – 1995–96
Njegoš Petrović – Granada – 2022–
Radosav Petrović – Almería, Real Zaragoza – 2019–
Ranko Popović – Almería – 1995–97
Stéphane Porato – Deportivo Alavés, Xerez – 2006–09
Dragan Punišić – Castellón – 1991–93
Uroš Račić – Tenerife – 2018–19
Nikola Radmanović – CP Mérida– 1996–97
Lazar Ranđelović – Leganés – 2021–
Dragan Rosić – Fuenlabrada – 2020–
Goran Šaula – Compostela – 1998–2000
Marko Šćepović – Mallorca, Lugo – 2014–15, 2022–
Slađan Šćepović – CP Mérida – 1996–97
Stefan Šćepović – Gijón, Getafe, Málaga – 2013–14, 2016–18, 2020–
Aleksandar Sedlar – Mallorca – 2020–21
Predrag Spasić – CA Marbella – 1994–95
Slavoljub Srnić – Las Palmas – 2018–
Jovan Stanković – Mallorca, Atlético Madrid, Lleida – 1995–97, 2001–02, 2004–05
Predrag Stanković – Hércules – 1997–99
Igor Stefanović – Córdoba – 2017–18
Zoran Stojadinović –  Deportivo de La Coruña, Figueres – 1990–91, 1992–93
Goran Stojiljković – Getafe, Mallorca, Leganés – 1995–98
Nikola Stojiljković – Mallorca – 2018–19
Stevan Stošić – Málaga – 2006–07
Vlada Stošić – Mallorca – 1992–94
Igor Taševski – Villarreal, Elche, Gijón – 1999–2000, 2001–05
Ivan Tomić – Rayo Vallecano – 2003–04
Saša Zdjelar – Mallorca – 2016–17
Igor Zlatanović – Numancia, Castellón – 2019–

Sierra Leone 
Mustapha Bundu – FC Andorra – 2022–

Slovakia 
Erik Jirka – Mirandés – 2020–
Marián Kelemen – Tenerife – 2004–06
Róbert Mazáň – Tenerife – 2019–20
Samuel Mráz – Mirandés – 2022–
Peter Pokorný – Real Sociedad B – 2021–
Samuel Slovák – Tenerife – 1999–2000
Martin Valjent – Mallorca – 2018–19, 2020–21

Slovenia 
Rene Krhin – Castellón – 2020–21
Milan Osterc – Hércules – 1998–2000
Matej Pučko – Osasuna, Real Oviedo – 2015–16, 2017–18
Haris Vučkić – Real Zaragoza – 2020–21

Sweden 
Edier Frejd – Las Palmas – 2002–03
Isak Jansson – Cartagena – 2022–
Mikael Martinsson – Castellón – 1987–88
Olof Mellberg – Villarreal – 2012–13
Markus Holgersson – Lorca – 2017–18
Nemanja Miljanović – Hércules – 1997–99
Esad Razić – Racing Ferrol – 2002–03
Fredrik Söderström – Córdoba – 2004–05

Switzerland 
Kevin Bua – Leganés – 2020–
Oliver Buff – Real Zaragoza – 2017–19
Lorenzo González – Málaga – 2019–20
Simone Grippo – Real Zaragoza, Real Oviedo – 2017–
Neftali Manzambi – Gijón, Córdoba – 2018–

Tanzania 
 Shaaban Idd Chilunda – Tenerife – 2018–19

Togo 
Djené Dakonam – Alcorcón – 2014–16
Simon Gbegnon – Mirandés – 2019–20

Tunisia 
Haythem Jouini – Tenerife – 2016–17
Kader – Numancia – 2014–15
Junas Naciri – Racing Santander, Real Valladolid, Real Murcia – 2001–02, 2010–13
Lassad Nouioui – Deportivo La Coruña – 2011–12
Adel Sellimi – Real Jaén – 1998–99

Turkey 
Necati Ateş – Real Sociedad – 2008–09
Sinan Bakış – FC Andorra – 2022–
Emre Çolak – Deportivo La Coruña  – 2019–20

Ukraine 
Dmytro Khomchenovskyi – Ponferradina – 2015–16
Vasyl Kravets – Lugo – 2016–20
Orest Lebedenko – Lugo – 2018–20, 2021–
Andriy Lunin – Real Oviedo – 2019–20
Yaroslav Meykher – Logroñés – 2020–
Bogdan Milovanov – Gijón – 2019–
Serhiy Myakushko – Alcorcón – 2019–
Yevhen Seleznyov – Málaga – 2018–19
Ivan Zotko – Elche – 2018–19
Roman Zozulya – Albacete, Fuenlabrada – 2017–

Uruguay 
Sebastián Abreu – Real Sociedad – 2008–09
Eduardo Acevedo – Deportivo La Coruña – 1986–87
Diego Aguirre – Marbella, Ourense – 1993–95
Martín Alaniz – Real Oviedo – 2016–17
Nicolás Albarracín – Lugo – 2017–18
Diego Alonso – Atlético Madrid, Real Murcia – 2001–02, 2005–06
Iván Alonso – Deportivo Alavés, Real Murcia – 2003–07, 2008–09
Matías Alonso – Real Murcia – 2009–10
Matías Arezo – Granada – 2022–
Sebastián Balsas – Córdoba – 2011–12
Eduardo Belza – Atlético Madrid B, Rayo Vallecano, Tenerife Las Palmas – 1981–84, 1986–87, 1988–89, 1990–92
Carlos Benavidez – Deportivo Alavés – 2022–
Mariano Bogliacino – Las Palmas – 2003–04
Juan Boselli – Albacete – 2018–19
Miguel Bossio – Valencia, Sabadell – 1986–87, 1991–92
Gastón Brugman – Real Oviedo – 2021–
Carlos Bueno – Real Sociedad – 2009–10
Santiago Bueno – Girona – 2019–
Erick Cabaco – Granada – 2022–
Javier Cabrera – Recreativo – 2014–15
Leandro Cabrera – Recreativo, Numancia, Hércules, Real Madrid Castilla, Real Zaragoza, Espanyol – 2010–17, 2020–
Fabián Canobbio – Celta Vigo – 2004–05, 2007–08
James Cantero – Lleida, Real Murcia – 1990–92, 1993–94
Felipe Carballo – Sevilla Atlético – 2017–18
Gabri Cardozo – Extremadura UD – 2019–
Fabián Coelho – Elche – 2006–08
Fernando Correa – Atlético Madrid, Real Valladolid – 2000–02, 2005–06
Gabriel Correa – Real Murcia, Mérida, Sevilla – 1990–92, 1994–95, 1996–97, 1998–99
Guillermo Cotugno – Real Oviedo – 2017–18
Sebastián Cristóforo – Girona, FC Cartagena – 2020–
Gustavo Díaz – Albacete – 1998–99
Jorge Díaz – Albacete, Real Zaragoza, Numancia, Reus – 2014–17
Carlos Diogo – Real Zaragoza, Huesca – 2008–09, 2012–13, 2014–15
Robert Ergas – Albacete – 2019–
Alfonso Espino – Cádiz – 2018–20
Gabriel Fernández – Real Zaragoza – 2020–
Óscar Ferro – Compostela – 1999–2000
Andrés Fleurquin – Córdoba, Cádiz – 2003–05, 2006–10
Carlos Andrés García – Vecindario – 2006–07
Pablo García – Atlético Madrid B – 1998–2000
Eduardo Gerolami – Recreativo – 1975–78
Emiliano Gómez – Albacete – 2020–
Ernesto Goñi – Almería – 2015–16
Cristian González (1976) – Las Palmas – 2002–03
Cristian González (1996) – Sevilla Atlético, Mirandés – 2016–18, 2019–
Nacho González – Hércules – 2012–13
Ramiro Guerra – Gimnàstic – 2018–19
Facundo Guichón – Alcorcón, Deportivo Alavés, UCAM Murcia – 2014–17
Adrián Gunino – Almería, Córdoba – 2012–14
Álvaro Gutiérrez – Rayo Vallecano, Gijón – 1997–98, 2000–01
José Herrera – Figueres – 1989–90
Diego Ifrán – Deportivo La Coruña, Tenerife – 2013–15
Andrés Lamas – Las Palmas, Recreativo – 2009–11
Martín Lasarte – Deportivo La Coruña – 1989–91
Mauricio Lemos – Las Palmas – 2019–20
Josemir Lujambio – Rayo Vallecano – 1998–99
Adrián Luna – Gimnàstic, Sabadell – 2011–12
Arsenio Luzardo – Recreativo – 1985–90
Federico Magallanes – Eibar – 2005–06
Guillermo Méndez – Alcorcón – 2013–14
Hernán Menosse – Recreativo, Granada, Lugo – 2013–15, 2017–19
Miguel Merentiel – Lorca – 2017–18
Óscar Javier Morales – Real Valladolid, Málaga – 2005–07
Richard Morales – Málaga – 2006–07
Álvaro Núñez – Numancia – 2001–04, 2005–08
Darwin Núñez – Almería – 2019–20
Lucas Olaza – Real Valladolid – 2021–
Mathías Olivera – Albacete – 2018–19
Nicolás Olivera – Sevilla, Córdoba – 1998–99, 2000–01, 2003–04
Antonio Pacheco – Albacete – 2004–06
Walter Pandiani – Villarreal – 2012–13
Danilo Peinado – Recreativo – 2011–12
Maximiliano Pérez – Tenerife – 2014–15
Inti Podestá – Sevilla – 2000–01
Nicolás Raimondi – Cartagena – 2012–13
Leonardo Ramos – Salamanca – 2000–01
Mario Regueiro – Racing Santander – 2001–02
Federico Ricca – Málaga – 2018–19
Diego Riolfo – Recreativo – 2012–13
Ignacio Risso – Ponferradina – 2006–07
Braian Rodríguez – Numancia – 2014–15
Brian Rodríguez – Almería – 2020–
Julio Rodríguez – Lleida, Numancia – 1995–99
Sergio Rodríguez Viera – Málaga, Hércules – 1951–52, 1956–58
Marcelo Romero – Málaga – 2006–07
Juan Manuel Salgueiro – Real Murcia – 2006–07
Gonzalo de los Santos – Málaga, Hércules – 1998–99, 2006–08
Michael Santos – Gijón, Leganés – 2017–18, 2020–
Juan Manuel Sarabia – Real Zaragoza – 2020–
Marcelo Saracchi – Levante – 2022–
Nicolás Schenone – Deportivo Alavés – 2013–14
Andrés Schetino – Sevilla B – 2016–17
Nicolás Schiappacasse – Rayo Majadahonda – 2018–19
Jimmy Schmidt – Hércules – 2005–06
Gastón Silva – FC Cartagena – 2021–
Marcelo Silva – Almería, Las Palmas, Real Valladolid, Real Zaragoza – 2011–13, 2014–17
Tabaré Silva – Sevilla, Levante – 1998–99, 2000–02
Cristhian Stuani – Albacete, Girona – 2010–11, 2019–
Damián Suárez – Elche, Getafe – 2012–13, 2016–17
Sebastián Taborda – Hércules – 2008–09
Marcelo Tejera – Logroñés – 1997–99
Franco Torgnascioli – Lorca – 2017–18
Emiliano Velázquez – Rayo Vallecano – 2017–18, 2019–
Maximiliano Villa – Ponferradina – 2019–
Giovanni Zarfino – Extremadura UD, Tenerife, Alcorcón – 2019–
Joaquín Zeballos – Girona – 2019–

USA 
Carlos Bocanegra – Racing Santander – 2012–13
Jonathan Gómez – Real Sociedad B – 2021–
Shaq Moore – Reus, Tenerife – 2018–
Tab Ramos – Figueres, Betis – 1990–94
Peter Vermes – Figueres – 1991–92

Venezuela 
Julio Álvarez – Racing Santander, Real Murcia, Numancia, Tenerife – 2001–02, 2004–08, 2010–17
Jovanny Bolívar – Albacete – 2022–
Ces Cotos – CD Lugo – 2022–
Rolf Feltscher – Getafe, Real Zaragoza – 2016–17
Víctor García – Alcorcón – 2020–
Alexander González – Huesca, Elche, Mirandés – 2015–20
Andreé González – Recreativo – 1999–2000
Dani Hernández – Huesca, Real Valladolid, Tenerife – 2009–10, 2011–12, 2014–
Jonay Hernández – Córdoba, Ciudad Murcia – 2004–06
Juanpi – Málaga – 2018–20
Darwin Machís – Hércules, Huesca, Granada, Cádiz – 2013–14, 2015–16, 2017–19
Josua Mejías – Gimnàstic – 2018–19
Miku – Ciudad Murcia, Gimnàstic, Salamanca, Rayo Vallecano – 2006–09, 2016–17
Manuel Morais – Lugo – 2019–
Ruberth Morán – Córdoba – 1999–2000
Daniel Noriega – Rayo Vallecano – 1997–98
Ricardo Páez – Castellón – 2009–10
Adalberto Peñaranda – Las Palmas – 2021–22
Álex Pereira – Gijón, Recreativo – 2000–02, 2003–05
Leomar Pinto – Elche – 2016–17
Rafael Ponzo – Tenerife – 2008–09
Eric Ramírez – Gijón – 2021–
José Manuel Rey – Pontevedra – 2004–05
Diosbert Rivero – Extremadura – 2018–19
Aristóteles Romero – Rayo Majadahonda – 2018–19
Salomón Rondón – Las Palmas – 2008–10
Roberto Rosales – Leganés – 2020–
Christian Santos – Deportivo La Coruña – 2018–20
Juan Carlos Socorro – Las Palmas, Elche – 1996–2001
Samuel Sosa – Alcorcón – 2019–
Jeffrén Suárez – Real Valladolid – 2014–15
Andrés Túñez – Celta Vigo, Elche – 2009–12, 2016–17
Mikel Villanueva – Cádiz, Reus, Gimnàstic, Málaga – 2017–20
Renzo Zambrano – Real Valladolid – 2016–17

Wales 
 Nathan Jones – Badajoz – 1995–96
David Vaughan – Real Sociedad – 2007–08

Zambia 
 Gabriel Kunda Jr – Real Zaragoza – 2014–15

Notes

 
 
Spain
Association football player non-biographical articles